A bachelor is an unmarried man, from the old French word "bachelor."

(The) Bachelor may also refer to:

 the title of anyone of any gender or marital status who holds a bachelor's degree

Film and TV
 The Bachelor (franchise), a reality television dating show franchise with numerous versions:
The Bachelor (American TV series)
The Bachelor (Australian TV series)
The Bachelor (Brazilian TV series)
 The Bachelor (British TV series)
The Bachelor Canada
The Bachelor (Greek TV series)
The Bachelor (Israeli TV series)
The Bachelor New Zealand
Burlacul, Romania
The Bachelor Vietnam
 The Bachelor (Chinese TV series), a drama series unrelated to The Bachelor franchise
The Bachelor, a 1909 Broadway play by Clyde Fitch, later filmed as A Virtuous Vamp (1919)
 The Bachelor (1955 film), an Italian film starring Alberto Sordi
 The Bachelor (1990 film), an Italian/Hungarian film starring Keith Carradine
 The Bachelor (1999 film), an American film starring Chris O'Donnell and Renée Zellweger
 Bachelor (2004 film), a Bangladeshi film released in 2004
 Bachelor (2021 film), Tamil film starring G. V. Prakash Kumar

Places

Canada
 Bachelor River, a tributary of Lake Waswanipi in Québec
 Little Bachelor River, a tributary of the Bachelor River

United States
 Bachelor Creek (disambiguation)
 Bachelor Mountain (disambiguation)
 Bachelor, Missouri, an unincorporated community
 Bachelor Lake (Brown County, Minnesota), a lake in Minnesota
 Bachelor Peak, a mountain in Texas
 Mount Bachelor, a mountain in Oregon, U.S.
 Bachelor Apartment House in Washington, D.C.
 Bachelor Island

Music

Albums
 The Bachelor (album), a 2009 album by Patrick Wolf
 Ginuwine...the Bachelor, an album by Ginuwine

Songs
 "Bachelor", a song by D'banj
 "The Bachelor", a song by Patrick Wolf from The Bachelor
 "The Bachelor", a classical song by Peter Warlock

See also
 The Bachelors (disambiguation)
 Bachelor in Paradise (disambiguation)
 Batchelor (disambiguation)
 Studio apartment or bachelor-style apartment
 Bachelorette (disambiguation)
 Bachelor's degree